Satondella brasiliensis is a species of minute sea snail, a marine gastropod mollusk or micromollusk in the family Scissurellidae, the little slit snails.

Description
The shell grows to a height of 0.9-1.0mm and has a unique chimney-like foramen.

Live S. brasiliensis is somewhat yellowish, whereas the shells are seen to be off-white.

The protoconch has a spiral, smooth and hexagonal sculpture.

The operculum is circular, thin, multispiral, with a central nucleus.

It has a narrow umbilicus and numerous axial ribs.

Distribution
Life species inhabits the West Atlantic Ocean along Cuba and Bermuda at a depth between 40-50 m in Cuba, and 81-91 m in Bermuda. 

Empty shells are found around the Bahamas, Florida, Gulf of Mexico, Honduras, Toboga Island, as well as Brazil, at depths between 28 and 198 m.

References

External links
 To Encyclopedia of Life
 To World Register of Marine Species

Scissurellidae
Gastropods described in 1987